Kywegya is a village in Mingin Township, Kale District, in the Sagaing Region of western Burma. It is located near the Chindwin River, southeast of Kyauk-o.

References

External links
Maplandia World Gazetteer

Populated places in Kale District
Mingin Township